Nopaline is a chemical compound derived from the amino acids glutamic acid and arginine.  It is classified as an opine. Ti plasmids are classified on the basis of the different types of opines they produce. These may be nopaline plasmids, octopine plasmids and agropine plasmids. These opines are condensation products of amino acids and keto acids or may be derived from sugars. The opines are used as carbon and nitrogen sources and metabolized by Agrobacterium.

References

Amino acid derivatives